Sree Kavitha Engineering College (SKEC) is situated in Karepally Town of Khammam district, India. It is affiliated to Jawaharlal Nehru Technological University, Hyderabad (JNTUH).

History
SKEC was established in 2001 with six departments (EEE, ECE, CSE, IT, MECH, civil) under the Spurthi Educational Society.

Departments 
The college offers study in the departments of electronics, electrical and computing. These are listed at Courses page.
The four departments are:
 Department of Electronics and Communication Engineering (ECE)
 Department of Electrical and Electronics Engineering (EEE)
 Department of Computer Science Engineering (CSE)
 Department of Information Technology (IT)
 Department of Master of Computer Applications (MCA)
 Department of Master of Business Administration (MBA)

 The campus is near to Singareni Colleries which is rich in coal deposits.

Facilities

Library
The college keeps stock of all books which are needed by the engineering academics as prescribed by the JNTUH syllabus. It maintains a collection of magazines and Technical journals. 
The college offers a Digital Library. The Internet can be used in the library.

Sports
Student sports include volleyball, cricket, and shuttle.
See Sports at SKEC.

Events
 Technoveda - The college technical fest published in  daily newspaper.
 College Day - annual college day comprises cultural events.
 College organizes recruitment fairs for students which is published in  daily newspaper.

See also 
Education in India
Literacy in India
List of institutions of higher education in Telangana

References

External links
Official website 
 Blog's    :  SKEC students blog and http://medhatithi.blogspot.com
 JNTU Academic Audit Cell : SKEC at JNTU 
 Indiastudy Channel column
 Collegespeaks column

Engineering colleges in Telangana
Educational institutions established in 2001
2001 establishments in Andhra Pradesh